United Nations Security Council Resolution 1951, adopted unanimously on November 24, 2010, after recalling previous resolutions on the situation in Côte d'Ivoire (Ivory Coast) and the subregion, the Council authorised a temporary re-deployment of support from the United Nations Mission in Liberia (UNMIL) to the United Nations Operation in Côte d'Ivoire (UNOCI) for a period of four weeks.

The Council had received a letter from the Secretary-General Ban Ki-moon regarding a run-off of the presidential election on November 28, 2010. It recalled provisions in Resolution 1609 (2005) that provided for co-operation between peacekeeping missions of the United Nations.

While acknowledging the need to support UNMIL in the fulfilment of its mandate in Liberia and the threat posed by the situation in Côte d'Ivoire to the subregion, the Council, acting under Chapter VII of the United Nations Charter, authorised a temporary re-deployment of two military helicopters and three infantry companies from UNMIL to UNOCI to provide security for the election for a period of no more than four weeks. The deployment was in addition to an extra 500 troops that were sent to assist with security during the election period.

See also
 Ivorian Civil War
 Ivorian parliamentary election, 2010
 Ivorian presidential election, 2010
 List of United Nations Security Council Resolutions 1901 to 2000 (2009–2011)

References

External links
 
Text of the Resolution at undocs.org

 1951
2010 in Ivory Coast
 1951
November 2010 events